Anne of Green Gables is a 1934 film directed by George Nicholls, Jr., based upon the 1908 novel Anne of Green Gables by Canadian author Lucy Maud Montgomery. Dawn O'Day, who portrayed the title character in the film, changed her stage name to Anne Shirley, which she was billed as for this and all subsequent roles. The film was a surprise hit, becoming one of four top-grossing films RKO made that year as noted in The R.K.O. Story, published by Arlington House.

A sequel, Anne of Windy Poplars, was released in 1940.

Plot
Anne Shirley is an orphan who has been adopted by farmer Matthew Cuthbert (O.P. Heggie) and his sister, Marilla (Helen Westley). Although the pair were expecting a young boy to help on their farm, Anne endears herself to them and to the local villagers. She befriends Diana Barry and most of the children at her school except for Gilbert Blythe after he calls her 'carrots' and she smashes her slate over his head. She and Diana have a bet that Anne can flirt with Gilbert, and he will fall head over heels in love with her. Little do they know, Gilbert overheard them and already has fallen in love with her. Anne flirts with him, which becomes unsuccessful, and Diana wins the bet. Anne lies to Gilbert that she has a boyfriend to make him jealous, but she only ends up embarrassing herself.

Shortly after, Anne is playing the Lady of Shalott when she realizes her boat is sinking, and Gilbert sees her and saves her life. She then decides to forgive him and give him a reward for saving her. She will kiss him. Gilbert is surprised. Anne thinks he doesn't want to claim his reward, but he tells her he does and that he wants her to be his girl. For three years they have a secret courtship, but Mrs. Barry spies on them and tells Marilla, who does not want Anne to even talk to Gilbert because his mother broke Matthew's heart. Anne and Gilbert are both devastated, and Matthew is upset with Marilla because it wasn't she who got her heart broken.

Anne goes to college. Diana, who now is married, visits Anne and tells her that Matthew is ill. She returns to Green Gables, finding out it's for sale to save Matthew because he needs the best doctor in Halifax. She remembers Gilbert is studying with this doctor, so she goes to see Gilbert. He tries flirting with her, and she eventually gives in and finds out that Gilbert heard about Matthew and begged the doctor to save him for free, which he did. After Marilla finds out what he had done, she forgives the Blythes and lets Anne and Gilbert see each other again.

Cast
 Anne Shirley as Anne Shirley
 Tom Brown as Gilbert Blythe
 Helen Westley as Marilla Cuthbert
 O.P. Heggie as Matthew Cuthbert
 Sara Haden as Mrs. Rachel Barry
 Murray Kinnell as Mr. Phillips, the teacher
 Gertrude Messinger as Diana Barry
 Charley Grapewin as Dr. Tatum
 Hilda Vaughn as Mrs. Blewett
 June Preston as Mrs. Blewett's daughter
 George Offerman Jr. as Herbert Root (uncredited) 
 Paul Stanton as Dr. Terry (uncredited)

Reception
The film made a profit of $272,000. The film is preserved with a copy at the Library of Congress.

References

External links
 
 Anne of Green Gables (1934)
 
 
 

1934 films
1934 comedy films
American comedy films
Anne of Green Gables films
American black-and-white films
Films scored by Max Steiner
Films set in Prince Edward Island
RKO Pictures films
Films directed by George Nicholls Jr.
1930s English-language films
1930s American films